Memorial Day is a 2012 war film starring James Cromwell, Jonathan Bennett and John Cromwell, directed by Sam Fischer and written by Marc Conklin.

Premise

The film tells the 1993 Memorial Day story of a 13-year-old German American boy, Kyle Vogel (Jackson Bond), who finds his Grandpa Bud's (James Cromwell) World War II footlocker during a game of hide and seek. Kyle strikes a deal with his grandfather to tell the stories behind any three objects he picks out of the footlocker, and the film proceeds to flash back to Bud's combat experience with the 82nd Airborne Division in World War II while also flashing forward to Kyle's future experiences with the 34th Infantry Division, also known as the "Red Bulls," in Iraq.

The three objects that young Kyle picks:
 Walther P38
 Fragmentation from "potato masher" - Stielhandgranate (German for "stick hand grenade")
 Picture of Bud with Sgt Jack O'Hara

Cast 
 Jonathan Bennett as future SSG Kyle Vogel - Iraq
 James Cromwell as Grandpa Bud Vogel - 1993
 John Cromwell as past LT Bud Vogel - WWII
 Jackson Bond as young Kyle Vogel - 1993
 Aaron Courteau as Frankie Califano - WWII
 Sean Dooley as Sgt Jack O'Hara - WWII
 Mary Kay Fortier-Spalding as Grandma Betty Vogel - 1993

Production

James Cromwell's son, John Cromwell, plays the young LT Bud Vogel of WWII.

References

External links

2012 films
2012 war drama films
American war drama films
Films set in 1944
Films set in 1945
Films set in 1993
Films set in 2005
2012 drama films
2010s English-language films
2010s American films